(Truly, truly I say to you), 86, is a church cantata by Johann Sebastian Bach.

An unknown poet began the text with a quotation from the farewell discourses of Jesus. He used a stanza of Georg Grünwald's hymn "" in movement 3 and as the closing chorale a stanza from "" by Paul Speratus (1524). Bach structured the cantata in six movements, a gospel quotation in the beginning, chorales as movements 3 and 6, otherwise recitatives and arias. He scored it for three vocal soloists, a four-part choir and a Baroque instrumental ensemble of two oboes d'amore, strings and continuo.

History and words 

Bach composed the cantata in Leipzig in his first annual cycle as Thomaskantor for the Fifth Sunday after Easter, called Rogate. The prescribed readings for the Sunday were from the Epistle of James, "doers of the word, not only listeners" and from the Gospel of John, from the farewell discourses of Jesus, prayers will be fulfilled. The theme of the cantata is a quotation from the gospel at the beginning, the promise of Jesus "Verily, verily, I say unto you, whatsoever ye shall ask the Father in my name, he will give you". An unknown poet used as movement 3 the 16th stanza of Georg Grünwald hymn "" (1530), and as the closing chorale the eleventh stanza of "" by Paul Speratus (1524). The poet hints at the question how the promise can be understood looking at the reality of life. In movement 2 he uses the image of a rose with thorns to illustrate two conflicting aspects. In movements 3 and 4 he confirms the promise which has to be seen in the perspective of time. Movement 5 refers to the waiting for a promise being kept, and the closing chorale assures that God knows the right time.

Bach first performed the cantata on 14 May 1724.

Music

Structure and scoring 

Bach structured the cantata in six movements, beginning with a biblical quotation for the vox Christi, Jesus speaking. An aria is followed by a chorale for the soprano, a set of recitative and aria, and the closing chorale, the only movement for choir. Bach scored the work for three vocal soloists (alto, tenor, bass), a four-part choir and a Baroque instrumental ensemble of two oboes d'amore (Oa), two violins (Vl), viola (Va) and basso continuo.

In the following table of the movements, the scoring follows the Neue Bach-Ausgabe. The keys and time signatures are taken from Alfred Dürr, using the symbol for common time (4/4). The continuo, playing throughout, is not shown.

Movements

1 
The gospel quotation, "Wahrlich, wahrlich, ich sage euch, so ihr den Vater etwas bitten werdet in meinem Namen, so wird er's euch geben. " (Truly, truly I say to you, whatever you ask of the Father in My name, so will it be given to you.), is given to the bass as the vox Christi, the voice of Jesus. The instruments, strings probably doubled by oboe d'amore, introduce vocal motifs which the voice picks up. The bass sings the text three times, while the instruments continue playing the same motifs. Julian Mincham observes: "The richness of the text, the unobtrusive nature of the melodic ideas and the gently flowing rhythms combine to create an appropriate atmosphere of dignified restraint".

2 
In the alto aria, "Ich will doch wohl Rosen brechen" (I will yet indeed pluck roses), the voice is accompanied by the strings and a violin obbligato in virtuoso figuration, which may illustrate the heavenly light promised as the final fulfillment. John Eliot Gardiner, who conducted the Bach Cantata Pilgrimage in 2000, interprets the solo violin's motif as an image of plucking a rose, who notes that the solo violin is silent when fulfillment is reached ("For He has pledged His word").

3 
In the chorale, "Und was der ewig gültig Gott in seinem Wort versprochen hat" (And whatever the eternally merciful God has promised with His word), the unadorned cantus firmus in the soprano is embedded in a trio of the two oboes d'amore and the continuo. Gardiner notes that the oboes' music may illustrate the "stratospheric circling of the angelic host" which the hymn text refers to.

4 
In a short tenor recitative for tenor, "Gott macht es nicht gleichwie die Welt, die viel verspricht und wenig hält" (God does not do as the world does, that promises much and upholds little), the musicologist Julian Mincham notes "a moment of harsh severity in the melody at the mention of the world′s failings".

5 
In the tenor aria, "Gott hilft gewiß; wird gleich die Hilfe aufgeschoben" (God helps indeed; even if that help is delayed), a motif on the first line is introduced by the violin, repeated by the voice, and repeated several times.

6 
The closing chorale, "Die Hoffnung wart' der rechten Zeit" (Hope awaits the right time), is set for four parts.

Recordings 
The selection is taken from the listing on the Bach Cantatas Website. Choirs with one voice per part (OVPP) and instrumental groups playing period instruments in historically informed performances are markeded green.

Complete cycles

References

Sources 

 
 Wahrlich, wahrlich, ich sage euch BWV 86; BC A 73 / Sacred cantata (6th Sunday of Easter) Bach Digital
 BWV 86 Wahrlich, wahrlich, ich sage euch: English translation, University of Vermont
 Luke Dahn: BWV 86.6 bach-chorales.com

External links 

 Wahrlich, wahrlich, ich sage euch, BWV 86: performance by the Netherlands Bach Society (video and background information)

Church cantatas by Johann Sebastian Bach
1724 compositions